Bugweri (sometimes called Bugweri Bufutulu) is one of the six traditional chiefdoms of the kingdom of Busoga in Uganda.

It was founded around 1726 and became a part of the British protectorate in Busoga in 1896. Its ruler is known as the Menya.

References 

Busoga
States and territories established in 1726